David Irwin may refer to:

David Irwin (explorer) (1910–1970), American arctic sled explorer
David Irwin (rugby union) (born 1959), Irish rugby union player
Dave Irwin (born 1954), Canadian skier
J. David Irwin (born 1939), engineer

See also
David Irving (disambiguation)
David Irvine (disambiguation)